Deanne Marie Mazzochi is a politician who was a Republican member of the Illinois House of Representatives from the 47th district from 2018 to 2023. The 47th district includes all or parts of Elmhurst, Oak Brook, Oakbrook Terrace, Western Springs, Clarendon Hills, Hinsdale, Westmont, and Downers Grove. She was the Chair of the College of DuPage Board of Trustees prior to her appointment to the Illinois House of Representatives.

Mazzochi was sworn in to succeed Patti Bellock on July 15, 2018. She was re-elected in 2020. She lost re-election in 2022 to Democrat Jenn Ladisch Douglass and has not publicly acknowledged or conceded her loss since then.

Career 
Mazzochi has Bachelor of Arts degrees in both political science and chemistry from Boston University, and a juris doctor from George Washington University Law School. She is a founding partner in the law firm Rakoczy Molino Mazzochi Siwik. The firm specializes in patent and life sciences law. Her House committee assignments during the 100th General Assembly were: Environment; Health & Healthcare Disparities; Judiciary—Civil; and Mental Health Committees.

In the 2022 legislative session, Mazzochi was a member of the following Illinois House committees:

 Appropriations - Higher Education Committee (HAPI)
 Child Care Access & Early Childhood Education Committee (HCEC)
 Commercial & Property Subcommittee (HJUA-COMM)
 Family Law & Probate Subcommittee (HJUA-FLAW)
 Housing Committee (SHOU)
 Judiciary - Civil Committee (HJUA)
 Judiciary - Criminal Committee (HJUC)
 Labor & Commerce Committee (HLBR)
 Prescription Drug Affordability Committee (HPDA)
 Workforce Development Subcommittee (HLBR-WORK)

Electoral history

References

External links
 
 Profile at Illinois General Assembly official website

Living people
21st-century American women politicians
Republican Party members of the Illinois House of Representatives
Women state legislators in Illinois
21st-century American politicians
Boston University College of Arts and Sciences alumni
George Washington University Law School alumni
Year of birth missing (living people)